Tituss Burgess (born February 21, 1979) is an American actor and singer. He has appeared in numerous Broadway musicals and is known for his high tenor voice. He is best known for starring as Titus Andromedon on the Netflix comedy series Unbreakable Kimmy Schmidt (2015–2020), for which he has received five Primetime Emmy Award nominations.

Personal life
Born and raised in Athens, Georgia, he attended Cedar Shoals High School where he was active in the theatre program. He graduated from the University of Georgia with a BA in music. He is gay.

Career
Burgess made his great Broadway debut in the musical Good Vibrations as Eddie in 2005, and then appeared in Jersey Boys in 2005 as Hal Miller. He originated the role of "Sebastian the Crab" in the musical The Little Mermaid in 2007 and went on to the role of Nicely-Nicely Johnson, traditionally played by a white actor, in the revival of Guys and Dolls in 2009. He has also performed in several regional theater productions, including The Wiz and Jesus Christ Superstar.

Burgess performed at the "Broadway for Obama" benefit concert held at the State Theatre Center for the Arts in Easton, Pennsylvania, on October 20, 2008. He performed at the "Broadway After Dark" benefit concert on October 26, 2008, in New York City. He performed in a solo concert at Birdland in New York City on July 27, 2009.

In July 2009, he was a performer on the R Family Vacations Summer Cruise. Three months later, he was featured on an episode of the popular web show The Battery's Down. He appeared in Season 5 of 30 Rock as D'Fwan, a member of Tracy Jordan's wife's entourage. He reprised the role in Season 6.

He was cast as The Caterpillar in the 2011 Broadway musical Wonderland in October 2010. A month later, he dropped out of the project.

In March 2013, Burgess performed "And I Am Telling You I'm Not Going" from the Broadway musical Dreamgirls at Broadway Cares/Equity Fights AIDS fundraising concert Broadway Backwards.

Burgess was cast in the role of The Witch, a role traditionally played by a female, in Into the Woods in a 2015 production by DreamCatcher Theatre which performed in Miami's Carnival Studio Theater at the Adrienne Arsht Center.

On March 6, 2015, Netflix released the first season of Unbreakable Kimmy Schmidt which stars Burgess in a main role as Titus Andromedon, Kimmy's roommate. Burgess received universal acclaim for his performance, with The New York Times stating that the role was tailor-made for him. For his performance in the first season, he received a nomination for Best Supporting Actor in a Comedy Series at the 2015 Critics' Choice Television Awards and an Emmy nomination for Outstanding Supporting Actor in a Comedy Series at the 2015 ceremony.

In June 2016, Burgess reprised his role of "Sebastian the Crab" during the Hollywood Bowl concert event of The Little Mermaid.

Since May 2020, he stars in the musical cartoon series Central Park as Cole Tillerman, alongside Leslie Odom Jr., Kristen Bell, Daveed Diggs, Josh Gad, Kathryn Hahn and Stanley Tucci.

On December 28, 2020, it was announced that Burgess will star as Remy in a benefit concert presentation of Ratatouille the Musical, an internet meme that originated on TikTok, inspired by the 2007 Disney/Pixar film. The concert streamed exclusively on TodayTix on January 1, 2021.

In August 2021, Burgess was cast as Rooster Hannigan in Annie Live!.

Theatre credits

Filmography

Film

Television

Video games

Discography 
Jersey Boys (2005) Original Cast Recording
Here's To You (2006) debut solo studio album, available on iTunes
Disney's The Little Mermaid (2008) Original Cast Recording
The Wonderful Wizard of Oz (2018) Audiobook, Narrator
Saint Tituss (2019)

Awards and nominations

References

External links 

1979 births
21st-century American male actors
African-American male actors
American male musical theatre actors
American male stage actors
American male television actors
American tenors
American gay actors
American gay musicians
LGBT African Americans
American LGBT singers
American male singers
LGBT people from Georgia (U.S. state)
Living people
Male actors from Georgia (U.S. state)
Musicians from Georgia (U.S. state)
People from Athens, Georgia
University of Georgia alumni
20th-century American LGBT people
21st-century American LGBT people
20th-century African-American male singers
21st-century African-American people